Sigue Cantando is the third full-length album released by the New Mexico musician Al Hurricane in 1973?.

Track listing

References

Al Hurricane albums
New Mexico music albums